The 1916 United States Senate election in Connecticut was held on November 7, 1916. Incumbent Republican Senator George P. McLean was re-elected to a second term in office over Democratic State Attorney Homer Stille Cummings.

General election

Candidates
Homer Stille Cummings, State Attorney for Hartford County and former Mayor of Stamford (Democratic)
Wilbur G. Manchester (Prohibition)
George P. McLean, incumbent Senator since 1911 (Republican)
Martin F. Plunkett (Socialist)
Otto Ruckser (Socialist Labor)

Results

References

Connecticut
1916
1916 Connecticut elections